Myiophasiini is a tribe of bristle flies in the family Tachinidae. There are at least 2 genera and about 18 described species in Myiophasiini.

Genera
 Cholomyia Bigot, 1884
 Gnadochaeta Macquart, 1851

References

Further reading

External links

 
 

Tachininae